Jeffrion L. Aubry (born February 8, 1948) is an American politician who represents District 35 in the New York State Assembly, which comprises East Elmhurst, LeFrak City, and parts of Corona, Woodside, Elmhurst and Rego Park, Queens.

Early life and education 
Aubry was born in New Orleans, Louisiana. He received a Bachelor of Arts from the College of Santa Fe (later the Santa Fe University of Art and Design) in 1969.

Career 
For sixteen years, he served as an employee of Elmcor Youth and Adult Activities (a not-for-profit organization), holding various positions, including executive director, and was also a teacher at New Mexico State Penitentiary for Eastern New Mexico University.

Prior to his election to the Assembly, Aubry served in a number of capacities within city government including as the director of economic development for the Office of the borough president of Queens and as the Queens representative to the Economic Development Corporation of the City of New York. He has also served as the chairman of the Small Business Development Center's advisory board at York College and as a consultant for Massand Associates, an engineering firm.

New York State Assembly 
Chosen in a special election in 1992, Aubry ran uncontested in the 2008 and 2010 general elections. He is currently a member of the Committee on Governmental Employees, Committee on Rules, Committee on Social Services and Committee on Ways and Means. Assemblyman Aubry is also a member of the Black, Puerto Rican, Hispanic & Asian Legislative Caucus. As the chairman of corrections, he introduced The Drug Law Reform, Drug Treatment and Crime Reduction Act of 2001, also known as the reform of the Rockefeller drug laws. Aubry stated the Rockefeller drug laws is "a failed policy that we can no longer sustain." Aubry is also a member of the Council of State Governments and is a recognized "Toll Fellow."

Aubry also serves as the chairman of the board of the Council of State Governments' Justice Center, a national organization which provides technical assistance to states to develop data driven consensus supported criminal justice policies to reduce crime and decrease the cost of incarceration nationwide.

Further reading
Paterson, David "Black, Blind, & In Charge: A Story of Visionary Leadership and Overcoming Adversity."Skyhorse Publishing. New York, New York, 2020

References

External links
New York State Assembly Member Website
Gotham Gazette's Eye On Albany: New York State Assembly: District 35
Biography: New York State Democratic Committee
Project Vote Smart: Interest Group Ratings
Fighting a Too Costly War; A Foe of Drugs Also Battles Harsh Laws of the 1970's

|-

1948 births
21st-century American politicians
African-American state legislators in New York (state)
Eastern New Mexico University faculty
Living people
Democratic Party members of the New York State Assembly
People from Queens, New York
Santa Fe University of Art and Design alumni
21st-century African-American politicians
20th-century African-American people